Jürgen Ligi (born 16 July 1959) is an Estonian politician, former Minister of Foreign Affairs, and a member and the Vice-Chairman of the liberal Reform Party. He was Minister of Education and Research in Taavi Rõivas' cabinet from 9 April 2015 to 12 September 2016. Previously, Ligi has served as the Minister of Defence from 2005 to 2007 and as the Minister of Finance from 2009 to 2014.

Early life
After graduating from Tartu Second Gymnasium in 1977, he studied geography and foreign economics at the University of Tartu. He also graduated from the Estonian Business School. Ligi has been the Head of Kuressaare Branch of the EVEA Pank, the Economic Advisor and Business Consultant to Kaarma Parish Rural Municipality Government, the Head of the Kuressaare Regional Office of the Estonian Chamber of Commerce and Industry, the Chief Specialist of Saaremaa Agro-industrial Association, and the Economist of the Planning Institute of the National Planning Committee.

Political career

Member of Parliament
Ligi was member of the Riigikogu from 1995–2005, from 2007–2009 and from 2014–2015.

Minister of Defence
From 2005 to 2007, Jürgen Ligi was the Minister of Defence.

Minister of Finance
On 3 June 2009, he was nominated Minister of Finance and sworn in a day later. In October 2014, Ligi raised controversy by bringing up the ethnicity of the Minister of Education and Research Jevgeni Ossinovski. Ligi later apologized, but was pressured to resign from his post.

Minister of Education and Research
On 9 April 2015, Ligi became the Minister of Education and Research in Taavi Rõivas' second cabinet.

Minister of Foreign Affairs
On 12 September 2016, Ligi was nominated Minister of Foreign Affairs, after the former Minister Marina Kaljurand had decided to step down and run for president.

Personal life
Jürgen Ligi is the son of archeologist Herbert Ligi. Jürgen's mother Reet's father was archeologist Harri Moora. His brother Priit Ligi was also an archeologist; he died on the cruise ferry MS Estonia that sank in 1994. Jürgen's sister Katre is married to poet Hando Runnel. He is also related to poet Juhan Viiding and politician Indrek Tarand. Jürgen Ligi himself is married and has two sons.

References

External links
Curriculum vitae - Estonian Government

|-

|-

|-

1959 births
20th-century Estonian economists
20th-century Estonian politicians
21st-century Estonian politicians
Defence Ministers of Estonia
Estonian Reform Party politicians
Finance ministers of Estonia
Government ministers of Estonia
Living people
Members of the Riigikogu, 1995–1999
Members of the Riigikogu, 1999–2003
Members of the Riigikogu, 2003–2007
Members of the Riigikogu, 2007–2011
Members of the Riigikogu, 2011–2015
Members of the Riigikogu, 2015–2019
Members of the Riigikogu, 2019–2023
Members of the Riigikogu, 2023–2027
Miina Härma Gymnasium alumni
Ministers of Foreign Affairs of Estonia
Politicians from Tartu
Recipients of the Order of the National Coat of Arms, 3rd Class
University of Tartu alumni